MVD Entertainment Group,  (previously Music Video Distributors, Inc.)  is an American production company and film distributor based in Pottstown, Pennsylvania, consisting of three main departments MVD Visual, MVD Audio, and MVD Distribution.

The company was founded by Tom Seaman in 1986 and today has released over 8,000 titles.

Home video labels

MVD Rewind Collection
In 2017, the company launched a line of Blu-ray releases called the MVD Rewind Collection. The line features cult movies not previously released on Blu-ray in North America, and some that were never even released on DVD. Each release is numbered and features a slipcover that gives a throw-back look of a weathered VHS case. The line does not focus on any particular genre, as was shown with the announcement of their first two releases, the punk music documentary D.O.A.: A Rite of Passage and the cult horror film Attack of the Killer Tomatoes.

MVD Marquee Collection and MVD Classics
In 2018, MVD announced they would add two new labels. The first one, MVD Marquee Collection, features Blu-ray releases of catalog titles that were too new to be considered cult. The line includes new to Blu-ray movies as well as re-releases of out of print titles. The other one, MVD Classics, will feature more obscure movies which may be released on DVD if an HD master isn't available. Unlike the Rewind Collection, neither of the lines are numbered.

References

American companies established in 1986
Companies based in Montgomery County, Pennsylvania
1986 establishments in Pennsylvania
Film distributors of the United States
Home video companies of the United States
Home video lines